Sir Samuel Weymouth Tapley Seaton,  (born 28 July 1950) was the fourth governor-general of Saint Kitts and Nevis from 2015 to 2023.

Early life and education
Seaton was born on Saint Kitts, the son of William A. Seaton and his wife, Pearl A. Seaton, nee Godwin. He received his primary and secondary education from Epworth Junior School, Basseterre High School, and St. Kitts-Nevis Grammar School. He attended the University of West Indies in Jamaica and received a Bachelor of Laws, a moment that set forth his legal career. He continued further studies with the Council of Legal Education, where he gained his Certificate, and the University of Bordeaux in France, where he completed a Diploma in French.

Career
Joined the St. Kitts-Nevis Judicial Service, and served as Registrar of the Supreme Court, Provost Marshal, and acting Additional Magistrate. In 1975, Seaton served as Crown Counsel for the Attorney General’s Chambers and worked as the High Court Registrar. In 1980, he took on the St. Kitts-Nevis Attorney General role, serving until 1995. In 1988, he was appointed as one of Her Majesty’s Counsels (Queen’s Counsel) 1988.

He became Acting Governor-General after the ouster of his predecessor Sir Edmund Wickham Lawrence on 20 May 2015. On 1 September 2015, he was officially appointed Governor-General by Queen Elizabeth II on the advice of Prime Minister Timothy Harris.

Aside from his official duties, Seaton has served on various Boards, National Committees, and Organisations. Some of these positions included Director of SSMC, the Chamber of Industry and Commerce, and Frigate Bay Development Corporation; President of the St. Christopher Heritage Society (now The St. Christopher National Trust), the St. Kitts-Nevis Bar Association and the OECS Bar Association; and Vice President for the Brimstone Hill Fortress National Park Society and the St. Christopher National Trust; Chairman of Cable & Wireless (formerly SCANTEL).

Awards and decorations
 Knight Grand Cross of the Most Distinguished Order of St Michael and St George (GCMG) (9 November 2015)
 Commander of the Royal Victorian Order (CVO) (23 October 1985)

References

1950 births
Governors-General of Saint Kitts and Nevis
Knights Grand Cross of the Order of St Michael and St George
Commanders of the Royal Victorian Order
Living people
Attorneys General of Saint Kitts and Nevis
British Saint Christopher and Nevis people
British colonial attorneys general in the Americas
Justices of the peace
Saint Kitts and Nevis Queen's Counsel
20th-century Saint Kitts and Nevis lawyers
21st-century Saint Kitts and Nevis lawyers